In algebra, an Okubo algebra or pseudo-octonion algebra is an 8-dimensional non-associative algebra similar to the one studied by Susumu Okubo. Okubo algebras are composition algebras, flexible algebras (A(BA) = (AB)A), Lie admissible algebras, and power associative, but are not associative, not alternative algebras, and do not have an identity element.

Okubo's example was the algebra of 3-by-3 trace-zero complex matrices, with the product of X and Y given by aXY + bYX – Tr(XY)I/3 where I is the identity matrix and a and b satisfy a + b = 3ab = 1. The Hermitian elements form an 8-dimensional real non-associative division algebra.  A similar construction works for any cubic alternative separable algebra over a field containing a primitive cube root of unity.  An Okubo algebra is an algebra constructed in this way from the trace-zero elements of a degree-3 central simple algebra over a field.

Construction of Para-Hurwitz algebra
Unital composition algebras are called Hurwitz algebras.

Scalar product
If  has characteristic not equal to 2, then a bilinear form  is associated with the quadratic form .

Involution in Hurwitz algebras

Assuming  has a multiplicative unity, define involution and right and left multiplication operators by

Evidently  is an involution and preserves the quadratic form. The overline notation stresses the fact that complex and quaternion conjugation are partial cases of it. These operators have the following properties:

 The involution is an antiautomorphism, i.e. 
 
  where 
 

These properties are proved starting from polarized version of the identity :

Hence . Similarly . Hence . By the polarized identity  so . Applied to 1 this gives . Replacing  by  gives the other identity.

Para-Hurwitz algebra
Another operation  may be defined in a Hurwitz algebra as

The algebra  is a composition algebra not generally unital, known as a para-Hurwitz algebra. In dimensions 4 and 8 these are para-quaternion and para-octonion algebras.

A para-Hurwitz algebra satisfies

Conversely, an algebra with a non-degenerate symmetric bilinear form satisfying this equation is either a para-Hurwitz algebra or an eight-dimensional pseudo-octonion algebra. Similarly, a flexible algebra satisfying

is either a Hurwitz algebra, a para-Hurwitz algebra or an eight-dimensional pseudo-octonion algebra.

References

 Susumu Okubo & J. Marshall Osborn (1981) "Algebras with nondegenerate associative symmetric bilinear forms permitting composition", Communications in Algebra 9(12): 1233–61,  and 9(20): 2015–73 .

Composition algebras
Non-associative algebras